Alkapuri is an urban area in the western side of Vadodara City, in the state of Gujarat, in India.

It is one of the oldest areas of the ever-growing Western part of Vadodara. It is also a Central Business District (CBD) of Vadodara.

Urban and suburban areas of Vadodara